The Snobs were a British rock group active in the mid-1960s.

The group, originally known as The Apostles, got their break after meeting Ivor Spencer, who became their manager.  They were best noted for their gimmick of performing in 18th-century period costumes, complete with buckle shoes and powdered wigs.

Their debut single, "Buckle Shoe Stomp", was co-written by Spencer and released on Decca Records in the UK in 1964.  The Snobs were hugely popular in Sweden and Denmark; Decca released a further Scandinavian single featuring covers of "Heartbreak Hotel" and "Giddy Up a Ding Dong".

The group travelled to the United States in 1964, where they played several concerts, appeared on The Red Skelton Show, and recorded a never-released cover of "Love Potion No. 9" with producer Gary S. Paxton.

The Snobs disbanded in 1965, having released only the two aforementioned singles.

Personnel
 Colin Sandland (lead guitar)
 Eddie Gilbert (drums)
 John Boulden (rhythm guitar)
 Pete Yerrell (bass guitar)

Discography

Singles
 "Buckle Shoe Stomp" (Sandland/Spencer/Boulden) b/w "Stand and Deliver" (Sandland/Boulden) – Decca Records, 1964
 "Heartbreak Hotell" [sic] (Axton/Durden/Presley) b/w "Ding Dong" [sic] (Bell/Lattanzi) – Decca Records, 1964

Videography
 The Snobs (British Pathé, 1964)

References

External links
The Snobs (British Pathé)

Buckleshoe Beat! (fan website)

Musical groups established in the 1960s
Musical groups disestablished in 1965
Beat groups